Abronia cuetzpali is a species of arboreal alligator lizard described in 2016 by Campbell, Solano-Zavaleta, Flores-Villela, Caviedes-Solís and Frost from the Sierra de Miahuatlán of Oaxaca, Mexico.

References

Abronia
Endemic reptiles of Mexico
Fauna of the Sierra Madre del Sur
Reptiles described in 2016
Taxa named by Jonathan A. Campbell
Taxa named by Darrel Frost